Cyanothemis is a monotypic genus of dragonflies in the family Libellulidae containing the single species Cyanothemis simpsoni. It is known by the common name bluebolt. It is native to central Africa, where it is known from Cameroon, the Democratic Republic of the Congo, Côte d'Ivoire, Ghana, Guinea, Liberia, Nigeria and Sierra Leone.

This dragonfly lives along rivers in forested habitat.

References

Libellulidae
Monotypic Odonata genera
Taxa named by Friedrich Ris